Gunnar Graarud (1 June 1886 - 6 December 1960) was a Norwegian operatic tenor. After making his debut in 1919, he was a leading artist at the Berlin State Opera from 1924-1926 and at the Vienna State Opera from 1929-1937. In 1927 he created the role of The blind judge in the world premiere of Erich Wolfgang Korngold's Das Wunder der Heliane at the Hamburg State Opera. In 1928 he sang the role of Tristan for the first recording of Richard Wagner's Tristan und Isolde. After retiring from the stage he was a member of the voice faculty at the Vienna Academy of Music. One of his notable pupils was bass Otto Edelmann.

Sources
Opera News, "Graarud, Gunnar", Vol. 26, 1961, p. 150,

Literature
 Klaus Ulrich Spiegel: "Repräsentant eines Ideals - Der stilbewusste Tenor Gunnar Graarud" - Edition HAfG Acoustics Hamburg 2013

1886 births
1960 deaths
Norwegian operatic tenors
20th-century Norwegian male opera singers